Rondeletia bicolor is a species of redmouth whalefish known only from the western Atlantic Ocean, where it is found at depths of around .

References

Cetomimiformes
Fish described in 1895